The secretary of state of Kentucky is one of the constitutional officers of the U.S. state of Kentucky. It is now an elected office, but was an appointed office prior to 1891. The current secretary of state is Republican Michael Adams, who was elected on November 5, 2019; he took office on January 6, 2020.

History and name of position
Despite the fact that Kentucky designates itself a commonwealth, the office itself is still referred to as "Secretary of State" (unlike Virginia, Massachusetts and Pennsylvania, which refer to the office as "Secretary of the Commonwealth"). The office was created by Article II, Section 17 of the Kentucky Constitution of 1792 simply as "the secretary". Article III, Section 21, of the Kentucky Constitution of 1850 changed the title of the office to Secretary of State.

Section 91 of the Kentucky Constitution of 1891 (the most recent state constitution), changed the method by which the secretary of state is selected. Prior to 1891, the secretary was appointed by the governor; under the present Constitution, the secretary of state is elected by the qualified voters of the state. The most recent election was in 2019. In 1992, the Constitution was amended to allow the secretary of state to serve two successive terms.

Emma Guy Cromwell ran for the office of Secretary of State, defeating another woman, Mary Elliott Flanery, and two men in the 1923 Democratic primary. In the general election, Cromwell went on to defeat her Republican opponent, Eleanor Wickliffe. She was sworn in on January 10, 1924 and became the first woman elected to statewide office in Kentucky.

Structure and duties of the office
The secretary of state's office is composed of five divisions:

The Business Services Division is responsible for maintaining records regarding creation and status of corporations and business entities, registration of trademarks and service marks, recording liens made pursuant to the Uniform Commercial Code.
The Elections Division certifies the name, party affiliation and ballot position of all candidates filed with him to the appropriate county clerks for ballot printing. The actual administration of elections is conducted by a separate, independent agency, the Kentucky State Board of Elections, of which the secretary of state serves as chair.
The Administrative Services Division appoints notaries public, issues apostilles, and serves as the registered agent for service of process in cases involving foreign corporations, as well as service of summons and petitions in actions against non-resident motorists.
Kentucky Land Office is an archive of land patents and land grants dating back to the colonial era.
Executive Branch of the Office of the Secretary of State files and maintains legislation passed by the Kentucky General Assembly and executive orders of the governor of Kentucky, including appointments to the Order of Kentucky Colonels. This division is also the keeper of the Seal of the Commonwealth of Kentucky and the personal seal of the secretary of state.

List of secretaries of state of Kentucky

See also
 Kentucky Attorney General

References

External links
Official homepage of the Kentucky Secretary of State
List of past Secretaries of State of Kentucky